Duplicates: A Concerto for Two Pianos and Orchestra is a concerto for two pianos and orchestra by the American composer Mel Powell.  The work was commissioned in 1987 by the philanthropist Betty Freeman for the Los Angeles Philharmonic.  It was first performed at the Dorothy Chandler Pavilion on January 26, 1990, by the pianists Alan Feinberg and Robert Taub and the Los Angeles Philharmonic under the conductor David Alan Miller.  The composition was awarded the 1990 Pulitzer Prize for Music.

Composition

Inception
In an April 1990 interview with The New York Times, Powell recalled of his inspiration for the composition:

Structure
Duplicates: A Concerto has a duration of approximately 32 minutes and is composed in three movements:
Onta
Three Interludes
"Onta" Variants

The second movement comprises three interludes respectively titled "Madrigal," "Immobile," and "Mobile."

Instrumentation
The work is scored for two solo pianos and an orchestra comprising piccolo, two flutes (1st doubling alto flute), two oboes, cor anglais, two clarinets, E-flat clarinet, bass clarinet, two bassoons, contrabassoon, four horns, three trumpets, three trombones, tuba, two harps, three percussionists, and strings.

Reception
Reviewing the world premiere, John Henken of the Los Angeles Times gave the work modest praise, remarking, "Large in dimension and ambition, and uncompromising in the atonal complexity of its thought and deed, Duplicates impressed heavily, but only intermittently entranced, on its first hearing."  He added:

References

Compositions by Mel Powell
1989 compositions
Concertos for two pianos
Pulitzer Prize for Music-winning works
Music commissioned by the Los Angeles Philharmonic